A list of films produced in France in 1967.

The list

See also
 1967 in France

References

Footnotes

Sources

External links
 French films of 1967 at the Internet Movie Database
French films of 1967 at Cinema-francais.fr

1967
Films
French